Gymnoscyphus ascitus is a small species of clingfish found in the Caribbean Sea (documented off of Cuba, Cozumel and St. Vincent) at depths of . This species is the only known member of the genus Gymnoscyphus.

References

Gobiesocidae
Fish of the Lesser Antilles
Marine fauna of North America
Marine fauna of South America
Monotypic ray-finned fish genera
Fish described in 1970